Griffin Boice, is an American multi-platinum record producer, mixer, songwriter, and composer.

Born and raised in Rexburg, Idaho, Griffin grew up playing the double bass for 10 years in the symphony orchestra.  Griffin was trained in the recording studio by Grammy nominated recording engineer Trent Walker.  Moving to Los Angeles in 2008, he signed a music publishing deal with EMI/Sony as a producer / songwriter.  Griffin has done software beta testing as well as co-creating sample libraries for virtual software instruments for Slate Digital.

Griffin has composed scores for feature films as well as music for advertisements, TV, and movie trailers.

Griffin Boice is the founder and creator of Puretone, a sonic meditation experience.

Griffin has worked with Black Eyed Peas, Wiz Khalifa, Rob Zombie, Hollywood Undead, John 5 (guitarist), The Saturdays, Leighton Meester, Christina Milian, Gavin Rossdale, Lucas Vidal, Clever aka Who Is Clever, Cassadee Pope, Aloe Blacc, Mat Musto aka Blackbear (musician), Krayzie Bone, Bebe Winans, Frankie J, Paradiso Girls

Discography

Film, tv, and trailer

References

External links
http://www.discogs.com/Wiz-Khalifa-Kush-OJ/release/2669422

Record producers from Idaho
Living people
Year of birth missing (living people)